The 2012–13 US Open Arena Soccer Championship is the fifth edition of an open knockout style tournament for arena/indoor soccer. In this edition, teams from the Professional Arena Soccer League, Premier Arena Soccer League, and other independent indoor soccer teams participate in the tournament.

US Open Arena Soccer Championship Bracket

Confirmed dates and matchups
All times local † Game doubles as regular season match

Wild Card round
 Sat. Nov. 17th, 7:05pm - San Diego Sockers (PASL) 18, Arizona Storm (PASL) 3 †
 Sat. Dec. 1st, 8:00pm - CSC Cavalry (PASL-Premier) 12, Denver Dynamite (PASL-Premier) 7
 Sat. Dec. 1st, 5:30pm - Chicago Mustangs (PASL) 8, Rockford Rampage (PASL) 7
 Fri. Dec. 14th - Anaheim Bolts (PASL) - Rescheduled as a Bye
 Sat. Dec. 15th, 7:00pm - Las Vegas Legends (PASL) 10, Real Phoenix (PASL) 4 †
 Fri. Dec. 21st, 7:00pm - Turlock Express (PASL) 9, Sacramento Surge (PASL) 6 †
 Fri. Dec. 29th - Real Harrisburg (Independent) 3, Harrisburg United (Independent) 1

Round of 16
 Sun. Dec. 2nd - Tacoma Stars (PASL) 12, Oregon Blacktails (PASL-Premier) 2
 Sat. Dec. 8th, 7:35pm - Detroit Waza (PASL) 13, Ohio Vortex (PASL) 3  †
 Sat. Dec. 15th, 5:30pm - Chicago Mustangs (PASL) 15, Illinois Piasa (PASL) 8 †
 Sat. Dec. 15th, 7:00pm - Cincinnati Saints (PASL-Premier) 12, River City Legends (PASL-Premier) 1 †
 Sat. Dec. 22nd, 7:05pm - San Diego Sockers (PASL) 14, Anaheim Bolts (PASL) 3 †
 Fri. Dec. 28th, 5:30pm - Turlock Express (PASL) 11, Las Vegas Knights (PASL-Premier) 10 (OT)
 Fri. Dec. 28th, 7:00pm - Las Vegas Legends (PASL) 18, CSC Cavalry (PASL-Premier) 3
 Fri. Jan. 4th, 7:30pm - Harrisburg Heat (PASL) 11, Real Harrisburg (Independent) 8

Quarterfinals
 Fri. Jan. 4th, 7:00pm - Las Vegas Legends (PASL) 15, Tacoma Stars (PASL) 6 †
 Sat. Jan. 5th, 7:05pm - San Diego Sockers (PASL) 11, Turlock Express (PASL) 7 †
 Sat. Jan. 12th, 7:30pm - Detroit Waza (PASL) 8, Harrisburg Heat (PASL) 4 †
 Sun. Jan. 20th, 5:00pm - Chicago Mustangs (PASL) 10, Cincinnati Saints (PASL-Premier) 7

Semifinals
 Fri. Jan 18th, 7:00pm - San Diego Sockers (PASL) 6, Las Vegas Legends (PASL) 5 †
 Sun. Jan 27th, 4:30pm - Detroit Waza (PASL) 9, Chicago Mustangs (PASL) 6 †

Championship
 Sat. Mar. 2nd, 7:35pm - Detroit Waza (PASL) 7, San Diego Sockers (PASL) 6 (at Melvindale Ice Arena)

Qualifying
Green indicates qualification for Qualifying Tournament Knockout Round(s)
Bold Indicates Qualifying Tournament Winner and qualification to US Arena Open Cup
All times local

US Open Cup - Arena Soccer Qualifiers

Saturday, November 3, 2012
Group Play
Group A
8:00 am - FC Indiana 3, Purdue University 0
9:00 am - Indiana University 8, Chargers FC 1
Group B
10:00 am Cincinnati Saints 4, A.A.F.C 3
11:00 am - Fort Wayne Sport Club 4, San Luis FC 2
Group A
12:00 pm - Indiana University 2, FC Indiana 6
1:00 pm - Chargers FC 2, Purdue University 6
Group B
2:00 pm - Fort Wayne Sport Club 2, Cincinnati Saints 5
3:00 pm - San Luis FC 4, A.A.F.C. 4
Group A
4:00 pm - Purdue University 3, Indiana University 10
5:00 pm - FC Indiana 4, Chargers FC 0
Group B
6:00 pm - A.A.F.C 5, Fort Wayne Sport Club 5
7:00 pm - Cincinnati Saints 6, San Luis FC 3
 
Sunday, November 4, 2012
Elimination Round
8:00 am - FC Indiana 3, San Luis FC 5
9:00 am - A.A.F.C. 3, Indiana University 2
10:00 am - Cincinnati Saints 3, Chargers FC 0
11:00 am - Fort Wayne Sports Club 8, Purdue University 3
Semi-Finals
12:00 pm - San Luis FC 4, A.A.F.C. 5
1:00 pm - Cincinnati Saints 4, Fort Wayne Sport Club 3
Championship Final
3:00 pm - Cincinnati Saints 5, A.A.F.C. 3
 Cincinnati Saints Qualify for US Arena Open Cup.

Group Matches: Sat. Nov. 10, 2012
10:00am - Los Bravos 7, Evansville Crush 4
12:00pm - River City Legends 4, Indy Elite FC 2
1:00pm - Evansville Crush 5, Cincinnati Saints 2
2:00pm - Paducah Premier 2, River City Legends 1
3:00pm  - Cincinnati Saints 5, Los Bravos 4
4:00pm  - Paducah Premier 5, Indy Elite FC 2

5th Place: Sat. Nov. 10, 2012
5:00pm - Cincinnati Saints v. Indy Elite FC

Semifinals: Sat. Nov. 10, 2012
6:00pm - River City Legends 7, Los Bravos 1
7:00pm - Paducah Premier 4, Evansville Crush 3

Finals: Sat. Nov. 10, 2012
8:00pm - River City Legends 3, Paducah Premier 0 (forfeit)
 River City Legends qualify for US Arena Open Cup

Rocky Mountain Qualifying - Sat. Dec. 1, 2012 (@ Monument, CO)

CSC Cavalry qualify for US Arena Open Cup

Harrisburg Qualifying - Sat. Dec. 29, 2012 (@ Harrisburg, PA)

Real Harrisburg qualify for US Arena Open Cup

References

United States Open Cup for Arena Soccer
United States Open Cup for Arena Soccer
Open Cup for Arena Soccer
Open Cup for Arena Soccer